List of current mayors of Pakistan according to the 2015 local government elections

List of major cities of Pakistan 

* Multiple Mayors

List of Khyber Pakhtunkhwa District nazims 
This is the list of 23 District Nazims and Naib Nazims of Khyber Pakhtunkhwa.

List of Balochistan mayors 
Chapter 3 "COMPOSITION OF LOCAL COUNCILS", clause 14 declares14. Election of Chairmen of Local Councils.- For every Local Council there shall be a Chairman who shall be elected in the prescribed manner: Provided that the Chairman of Metropolitan Corporation may be designated as Mayor.According to Balochistan local Govt Act 2010, it has only one mayor for Quetta Metropolitan Corporation.

List of Punjab mayors 
there are total of 12 mayors in Punjab for 11 municipal corporations and one metropolitan corporation.

The Punjab Local Govt defines mayor and deputy mayor as:(k) “Deputy Mayor” means a Deputy Mayor of the Metropolitan Corporation or a Municipal Corporation;(x) “Mayor” means the Mayor of the Metropolitan Corporation or a Municipal Corporation;PLGA 2013 also defines Metropolitan and municipal corporations as;(z) “Metropolitan Corporation” means Metropolitan Corporation Lahore;CHAPTER III CONSTITUTION OF LOCAL GOVERNMENTS(d) an integrated urban area having a population of more than five hundred thousand to be a Municipal Corporation.

List of Sindh mayors 
There are 4 mayors of Sindh, one mayor for metropolitan corporation, 3 mayors for municipal corporations.

The Sindh Local Govt defines mayor and deputy mayor as:x. ‘Chairman’ means the chairman and include chairperson of Council constituted under the Act but in the case of a Municipal Corporation or a Metropolitan Corporation, the Chairman may be called the Mayor.xlviii. “Mayor” means the Mayor of a Corporation;xxi. “Deputy Mayor” means the Deputy Mayor of the Corporation;CHAPTER- III CONSTITUTION AND COMPOSITION OF COUNCILS, (4) Metropolitan Corporation. There shall be a Metropolitan Corporation for Karachi Division

References 

Mayors of Pakistan
Mayors